Jatiel is a municipality located in the Bajo Martín comarca, province of Teruel, Aragon, Spain. According to the 2010 census the municipality has a population of 52 inhabitants. Its postal code is 44592.

It is an agricultural town, reputed for the quality of the local peaches.

See also
Bajo Martín
List of municipalities in Teruel

References

External links 

Jatiel site
 Jatiel, CAI Aragon
Heraldica Teruel

Municipalities in the Province of Teruel